The 2022 European Senior Tour, titled as the 2022 Legends Tour, was the 31st season of the European Senior Tour, the professional golf tour for men aged 50 and above operated by the PGA European Tour. It was also the second season since rebranding as the Legends Tour.

Schedule
The following table lists official events during the 2022 season.

Order of Merit
The Order of Merit was based on prize money won during the season, calculated using a points-based system.

Notes

References

External links

European Senior Tour
European Senior Tour